The 11th Hollywood Music in Media Awards was held on January 27, 2021 to recognize the best in music in film, TV, video games, commercials, and trailers. The nominations were announced on January 15, 2021. Kenny Loggins was honored with the Career Achievement Award.

Winners and nominees

Score

Song

Music Supervision

Other

2020 Music Genre Winners
Following artists have been awarded in the 2020 Music Genre categories:

Rising Star Award (Female)
Annabel Whitledge

Rising Star Award (Male)
Alexander James Rodriguez

Adult Contemporary/AAA
Estrella Cristina

Alternative
Modern Eyes

Americana/Folk/Acoustic
Derek Woods Band

Blues
Samantha Fish

Children's Music
Kendra K

Christian/Gospel
Chris Bender

Contemporary Classical
Brian Ralston

Country
Johnny Collier

Dance
Therése Neaimé

Downbeat/Downtempo
Lionel Cohen & JVMIE

EDM (Electronic Dance Music)
Philippe Funk

Holiday
Juliet Lyons & Robin Sandoval

Instrumental
Armin Kandel

Instrumental Performance (Guitar)
AM Dandy (United States)

Instrumental Performance (Orchestra)
Suad Bushnaq (Canada)

Instrumental Performance (Piano)
Goetz Oestlind (Germany)

Instrumental Performance (Violin)
Alejandra Torres & Roberto Quintero (Austria)

Jazz
ABC

Latin (Pop/Rock/Urban)
Daniel Minimalia ft. Esmeralda Grao

Latin (Traditional)
Quintero's Salsa Project

Live Stream Performance - Presented by Gigmor
Model Stranger

Lyrics/Lyricist
Kapri

Message Song/Social Impact
Reina (Ft. Verdine White, Nipsey Hussle)

New Age/Ambient
Peter Sterling

Pop
Riotron

Producer/Production - Presented by Dynaudio
Noah Lifschey

R&B/Soul
Savannah Brister

Rap/Hip Hop
Derin Falana

Reggae - Presented by Island City Media Group
Conkarah ft. Shaggy

Rock
Aris Paul Band

Singer-Songwriter
Shelly Peiken

Vocal (Female)
Taylor Castro

Vocal (Male)
Kai Straw

World
Fahad Al Kubaisi

2020 Music Genre Nominees
Americana/Folk/Acoustic
Angela Parrish & Ian Honeyman
Chet Nichols
Chris Watkins / Drunk Poets
DeDe Wedekind
Derek Woods Band
J Edna Mae
Peter Olsen
The Sometimes Boys
Blues
Anthony Gomes
Dallas Hodge
Dean James
Samantha Fish
Tom Euler
Trevor Sewell

Contemporary Classical
André Barros
Brian Ralston
Dimitris Dodoras
Fabian Kratzer
Jennifer Thomas
Jing Zhang
Lolita Ritmanis
Matias Bacoñsky
Michael Maas
Michel Huygen & The London Symphony Orchestra
Oli Jogvansson
Simone Cilio
Stéphanie Hamelin Tomala

Country
Alan Morgan
Andreas Stone
Austin Hopkins
Brent Payne
Dolylamby
Grant Maloy Smith
Johnny Collier
Michael Lusk
Tiffany Ashton

Jazz
Cynthia Thijs Coenraad
Dimitris Angelakis
Duo Manibe'
George & The Good Vibes
Mark Etheredge
Milana Zilnik
Paul Messina
Paul W. Rucker
Peter Xifaras' Symphonex Orchestra
Ralph Johnson ft. Gerald Clayton
Roberto Tola
Suzanne Grzanna
Udo Pannekeet

Instrumental
Elly Jay
Iros Young
Joep Sporck
Jon Altham
Masa Takumi
Octavio Bernal
Roman Miroshnichenko
Sybrid
Wouter Kellerman & Nadia Shpachenko

Latin (Pop/Rock/Urban)
Daniel Minimalia ft. Esmeralda Grao
Juan Francisco Zerpa
La Santa Maria
Nico Donys
Willie Gomez, Paulina Aguirre, Gustav Afsahi, BLUTH
Singer-Songwriter
Carson Rowland
Charles V. Rox Vaccaro
Charly Reynolds
Darla Cozzarelli
Gavriel
Gregory Crimson
Joe Cameron
Sean Waterman
Terry Blade

Rising Star Special Awards

Rising Star (Male)
Alexander James Rodriguez

Rising Star (Female)
Annabel Whitledge

Career Achievement Honor
Kenny Loggins

References

External links
Official website

Hollywood Music in Media Awards
Hollywood Music in Media Awards
Hollywood Music in Media Awards
Hollywood Music in Media Awards